Porsche Challenge is a racing video game developed by SCE Studios Soho and published by Sony Computer Entertainment released for the PlayStation. The player and computer-controlled cars in the game consist of Porsche Boxsters.

Gameplay

Players must choose one of the Porsche Boxsters at the start of each race and race around tracks trying to win. Each car has a different driver and each driver has a different personality. The drivers can comment on how other drivers drive and their relationship with the other drivers can affect this as well. Usually they say how bad the other drivers are and how they are better.

There are three types of races for each track:

Classic - The player races in an arcade-type fashion. No changes to the environment.
Long - A long race where barriers, shortcuts and numerous other features are changed throughout the race; the player must notice these small changes to ensure their chances of winning races. The changes are made once every lap.
Interactive - This type of race randomises tracks, physically changing the track all the time. While driving, all of a sudden the track could change, forcing the player to go the long way around.

The game also features time trial and practice modes.

Development
Development on Porsche Challenge began in 1995. The license agreement with Porsche allowed the game designers to work with Porsche employees in order to accurately model the Boxster's appearance and performance. Each of the six drivers were individually motion captured to create their own distinctive animations.

As is common in the racing genre, Porsche Challenge was programmed with a "catch-up AI", which causes AI-controlled cars to drive faster and more skillfully when a player car is ahead of them than when they are in the lead.

Release
Following the game's release in Europe, according to Next Generation it "oddly languished in limbo for months until SCEA decided to pick it up for release in the U.S.", scheduling it for August 1997.

Reception

Porsche Challenge received an average score of 73% at GameRankings, based on an aggregate of 12 reviews. In August 1998, the game earned a "Platinum" award from the Verband der Unterhaltungssoftware Deutschland (VUD), indicating sales of at least 100,000 units across Germany, Austria and Switzerland.
 
Though most critics concluded that Porsche Challenge is a competent title which falls far short of greatness, otherwise reactions to the game varied widely and sometimes contradicted each other. For example, while Next Generation, Game Revolution, and Dean Hager of Electronic Gaming Monthly praised the car's handling as indistinguishable from driving a real Porsche boxster, GamePro, Glenn Rubenstein of GameSpot, and Hager's co-reviewer Kraig Kujawa all contended that the realism of the handling makes the racing frustrating and less enjoyable. Where Hager found the characters "goofy" and opined that they should have been gotten rid of, and GamePro said that the selection of characters has no impact on the gameplay, Next Generation, one of the few publications to give Porsche Challenge a positive recommendation, asserted that "The presence of six different drivers, each with a unique driving style, takes care of the problem of having just one kind of car."

Kujawa found that where Porsche Challenge falls short is that it lacks the excitement of top-line racing titles. Rubenstein, in addition to criticizing the unrealistic graphics and weak sense of speed, felt that the game simply fails to distinguish itself among the glut of racing games coming to market, leaving gamers "just as well-off waiting for the next driving game to hit the market, which will most likely be in about a day or two." While contending that the game has outstanding sound effects and "some of the most realistic graphics we’ve seen", Game Revolution also cited a lack of excitement, and added that the small RPM display further keeps the game from having impact. GamePro judged that the game needed more tracks to have true "staying power", though most critics found that the variations in the tracks which open up during play gives the game plenty of longevity.

References

External links

1997 video games
PlayStation (console) games
PlayStation (console)-only games
Porsche
Racing video games
Sony Interactive Entertainment games
Video games developed in the United Kingdom
Multiplayer and single-player video games
Team Soho games